Martin Community College is a public community college in Williamston, North Carolina. It is part of the North Carolina Community College System.

History

Martin Technical Institute Foundation Inc was founded in 1972 to secure funding for a community college in Martin County. In 1976, Martin Technical Institute changed its name to Martin Community College.

Academics
799 students are enrolled in Martin Community college with a variety of degrees and certificates. MCC is unique among community college having its own equine health program.

References

External links
 Official website

North Carolina Community College System colleges
Education in Martin County, North Carolina
Educational institutions established in 1976
Two-year colleges in the United States
1976 establishments in North Carolina